Acrobasis irrubriella is a species of snout moth in the genus Acrobasis. It was described by Charles Russell Ely in 1908 and is known from Connecticut, United States.

References

Moths described in 1908
Acrobasis
Moths of North America